This is a list of War Memorial windows by Christopher Whall.

Whall's other works include:
 Gloucester Cathedral
 Works in Scotland
 Cathedrals and Minsters windows

Stained-glass windows serving as War Memorials

Here are details of some of these war memorial windows.

gallery

References

Christopher Whall
Whall